The Spain national U-18 basketball team (Spain Youth national basketball team), is the representative for Spain in international basketball competitions, and it is organized and run by the Spanish Basketball Federation. The Spain national U-18 basketball team represents Spain at the FIBA Europe Under-18 Championship, where they are the current reigning champions.

It is the only team that has appeared at every FIBA Europe Under-18 Championship since it was first held in 1964.

FIBA Europe Under-18 Championship

See also
Spanish Basketball Federation
Spain national youth basketball teams
Spain women's national under-18 basketball team

References

Men's national under-18 basketball teams
Basketball